Joseph Stewart Temple Fall,  (17 November 1895 – 1 December 1988) was a Canadian aviator, military officer, and First World War flying ace credited with 36 aerial victories.

Early life
Fall was born into a farming family on Vancouver Island, British Columbia. He tried to enlist in the army but was rejected because he had suffered a head injury when he was a child. However, he was accepted as a candidate for the Royal Naval Air Service on 23 August 1915.

Military service
The Canadian government would not support a flying school, so Fall went to England for training. He left Canada on 12 November 1915, and was in England in January 1916.

Fall flew a Sopwith Pup for some time in No. 3 Squadron RNAS before he achieved his first success on 6 April 1917. A Halberstadt D.II dived on him with a frontal attack; Fall half-looped onto the German plane's tail and fired 50 rounds to down him. Fall would score 10 more victories before changing planes to the Sopwith Camel. The 11 victories with the Sopwith Pup made Jo Fall the highest scoring Pup ace. He would score 2 more shoot-downs with No. 3 Squadron, using the Camel.

On 30 August 1917, he was transferred to No. 9 Squadron RNAS as a flight commander, still flying Camels. He claimed another 23 victories with No. 9 Squadron, with the final one occurring on 22 December 1917. On 24 April 1918, Fall joined the School of Aerial Gunnery and Fighting at RAF Freiston, serving their as an Acting Squadron Commander Instructor until the end of the war.

Falls' claims tally consisted of 11 (and 12 shared) aircraft destroyed, 10 (and 3 shared) 'out of control'.

Fall stayed in the Royal Air Force from its inception on 1 April 1918. He was promoted to squadron leader on 17 July 1929 and placed on half-pay from 1 June 1930 to 8 January 1931. He was promoted to wing commander on 1 January 1936 and to temporary group captain on 1 July 1940. He retired as a group captain in 1945 and died in 1988.

Honours and awards
 23 May 1917 – Distinguished Service Cross – Flt. Sub-Lieut. Joseph Stewart Fall, R.N.A.S. 
 19 December 1917 – Bar to the Distinguished Service Cross – Flt. Lieut, (act. Flt. Cdr.) Joseph Stewart Temple Fall, D.S.C., R.N.A.S. 
 19 December 1917 – Second Bar to the Distinguished Service Cross – Flt. Lieut, (act. Flt. Cdr.) Joseph Stewart Temple Fall, D.S.C., R.N.A.S. 
 1 January 1919 – Air Force Cross – Capt. John Stewart Temple Fall, D.S.C. in recognition of distinguished service.

References

Bibliography
 Norman Franks. "Sopwith Pup Aces of World War I" (Aircraft of the Aces), Osprey Publishing, 2005.
 Norman Franks. "Sopwith Camel Aces of World War I" (Aircraft of the Aces), Osprey Publishing, 2004.

Canadian aviators
Canadian World War I flying aces
Recipients of the Air Force Cross (United Kingdom)
Royal Air Force officers
Royal Naval Air Service personnel of World War I
Royal Air Force personnel of World War I
Royal Air Force personnel of World War II
Royal Naval Air Service aviators
1895 births
1988 deaths
People from the Cowichan Valley Regional District
Canadian recipients of the Distinguished Service Cross (United Kingdom)